Anam Cara Writer's and Artist's Retreat is a project in the village of Eyeries, County Cork, Ireland, which provides accommodation and a supportive environment for writers and other creative workers to develop their ideas.  It was founded in 1998, and has hosted more than a thousand writers, artists, composers and choreographers since then.

History
The retreat centre is owned and directed by Sue Booth-Forbes, a teacher, writer, editor and coach, who describes her work with writers, for example, as that of a "literary midwife."  Booth-Forbes, an Arts and Politics graduate of Brigham Young University, also qualified as a teacher, and worked teaching English at high school level, later holding several editorial positions, including with the University of Virginia, Cambridge University Press and, from 1984 to 1997, as Editor of the Mormon women's magazine Exponent II, for which she had written since its foundation.

Having led multiple retreats in the US, and a prolonged literary retreat with friends in Connemara, Booth-Forbes decided to seek a new base in Ireland, and then decided to launch a residential creative retreat location.  In November–December 1997 she searched with her daughter, and, after a hint from an academic writer friend, Claudia Harris, in December 1997 purchased a property in the small and remote village of Eyeries, on the West Cork part of the Beara Peninsula.  This was launched as the Anam Cara Writers Retreat in summer 1998.  The retreat name, which means "soul friend," was chosen partly to pay tribute to the works of John O'Donohue.

Over the more than twenty years, over 1,000 creative guests - writers, composers, choreographers, visual artists - have visited, leaving more than 500 works on the shelves and walls in the common areas of the house.  Many guests have commented on the benefits of the retreat, and several have included dedications to its director in their issued work. Several have visited multiple times, one on more than a dozen occasions, and at least one has also moved to the Beara peninsula.

Facilities and operations
The retreat house comprises a set of private rooms, and a number of common spaces, with a library in addition to books in most rooms, and extensive quiet grounds.  Within the grounds a wide range of private working locations have been developed, in garden settings, by a duck pond, and on a landscaped river bank, as well as relaxation aids such as a labyrinth, meditation huts, and an accessible island within the small river.  There is also a sauna, and a hot tub where guests and retreat leaders can relax and discuss work in progress.  Parking is available but guests are encouraged to avoid the distraction of driving, and having remained offline for many years, there is wireless internet for visitors who need it.  The location can be reached by a daily private bus from Cork city.

Anam Cara offers two broad types of retreat: guided and self-directed.  The guided workshops, usually hosted by 1-2 coaches or teachers, cover a wide range of topics, and occupy several weeks each year.  For the rest of the year, creative guests can develop their own work, aided by discussions with the retreat's director, and with fellow guests.  In these retreat periods, the house operates on a silent regime from after breakfast to dinner time.  It has been commented that guests sometimes come to work on one art, and shift to another, and that some guests continue cooperation after their visits.

Prospective guests are asked to send a summary of their proposed project, but even beginning writers and artists are welcome, in contrast to some more formal retreat centres, which target, for example, a track record of published or displayed work.

Artistic competitions, events and publication
The retreat has sponsored competitions for many years, with prizes including free visits to the facility.  The location also hosts a range of events. Some of the competitions and events raise funds for charity.

The retreat has published a book, in aid of Pieta House, Diving into the Mystery: Studies in the Creative Process.

Recognition and guests
Aside from endorsements by guests, listed as a top five retreat by Canada's Globe and Mail, as well as in articles in the Irish Times, and magazines in England and Wales. As a private establishment, the retreat does not publish data on guests but some who have commented on their experiences include Nessa O'Mahony, former US Poet Laureate Billy Collins, Alex Barclay, Man Booker Award finalist Jhumpa Lahiri, celebrity chef Gerry Galvin, Bernard O'Donoghue, Leanne O'Sullivan, Sassa Buregren, Ulf Lindström and Réaltán Ní Leannáin.

See also
 Cill Rialaig
 Tyrone Guthrie Centre, Annaghmakerrig

References

External links
Anam Cara Writer's and Artist's Retreat

1998 establishments in Ireland
Arts in Ireland
Arts centres in Ireland
County Cork